The following outline is provided as an overview of and topical guide to the principles of interpretation:

Principles of interpretation – methods used to understand language and texts, primarily legal documents and sacred texts. Principles of interpretation may be used in the areas presented below...

Christianity 
 Biblical hermeneutics, the study of the principles of interpretation concerning the books of the Bible
 Biblical studies - Principles of Biblical interpretation
 Daniel 2 - Interpretation given by Daniel
 Daniel 7 - Interpretation given by Gabriel
 Daniel 8 - Interpretation given by Gabriel 
 Johann Albrecht Bengel
 Cornelius Van Til
 List of Church Fathers - Tichonius

Judaism 
 Moshe Shmuel Glasner
 Talmudical hermeneutics

Islam 
 Qur'an - Interpretation and meanings
 Qur'anic hermeneutics

Law and government 
 Canadian constitutional law
 Traditional Chinese law
 Francis Lieber
 Allonby v Accrington and Rossendale College
 Attorney General of Belize v Belize Telecom Ltd
 Interpretation (Catholic canon law)

Other uses 
 Heritage interpretation - "Tilden's principles" of interpretation
 Interpretive planning, an initial step in the planning and design process for informal learning-based institutions

See also 
 Exegesis
 Hermeneutics

Outlines of laws and legal topics
Wikipedia outlines